Hydrocotyle hitchcockii is a species of flowering plant in the family Araliaceae. It is endemic to Ecuador. Its natural habitats are subtropical or tropical moist lowland forests and subtropical or tropical moist montane forests.
It is threatened by habitat loss.

References

hitchcockii
Endemic flora of Ecuador
Least concern plants
Taxonomy articles created by Polbot